"Waiting" is the first single of British progressive rock band Porcupine Tree, released in May 1996. It came in two formats: a regular CD and a 12" vinyl. At the time, the single was intended to promote the forthcoming album Signify. The song is divided into two parts, the second one being an instrumental follow-up.

Waiting is considered the first Porcupine Tree single for its length, since Voyage 34 and Voyage 34: Remixes are singles of around 30 and 40 minutes respectively that would fit better in the category of EPs.

The song entered the UK Indie Chart, attracting airplay all over Europe.

Porcupine Tree contributed an edit of "Waiting (Phase Two)" to the soundtrack for Paul Spurrier's movie Underground, whereas the credits erroneously listed "Waiting (Phase One)".

Track listing

CD Version
"Waiting (Phase One)" - 4:27
"Waiting (Phase Two)" - 6:19
"The Sound of No-One Listening" - 8:20

12" vinyl
Side A
"Waiting (Phase One)" 4:27
"Waiting (Phase Two)" 6:25
Side B
"Colourflow in Mind" 3:52
"Fuse the Sky" 4:34

Promo CD version
"Waiting (Phase One)" - 4:27
"Waiting (Phase Two)" - 6:19
"Rainy Taxi" - 6:45
C+S pressed a few hundred copies of this three track CD single to promote their subsequently withdrawn release of the "Signify" album. The third track is taken from the "Staircase Infinities" mini album.

Notes
"Waiting (Phase One)" and "Waiting (Phase Two)" both appeared on the album Signify. "The Sound of No-One Listening", "Colourflow in Mind" and "Fuse the Sky" were subsequently released on the compilation album Stars Die (with the first one being remixed).

References

1996 singles
Porcupine Tree songs
1996 songs
Songs written by Steven Wilson